Zoltán Kásás (born 15 September 1946 in Alpár) is a Hungarian former water polo player who competed in the 1972 Summer Olympics.

See also
 List of Olympic medalists in water polo (men)
 List of world champions in men's water polo
 List of World Aquatics Championships medalists in water polo

References

External links
 

1946 births
Living people
Hungarian male water polo players
Hungarian water polo coaches
Olympiacos Water Polo Club coaches
Olympic water polo players of Hungary
Water polo players at the 1972 Summer Olympics
Olympic silver medalists for Hungary
Olympic medalists in water polo
Medalists at the 1972 Summer Olympics
20th-century Hungarian people